The LK-1 (Leningradskii Kombinat - Leningrad combine), (a.k.a. Fanera-2 – Plywood no.2), (a.k.a. NIAI-1) was a blended wing four-seat cabin aircraft designed and built in the USSR from  1933.

Development 
In 1930 the LIIPS ( - Leningrad institute for sail and communications engineers) formed a UK GVF ( - training centre for civil air fleet), in turn the UK GVF formed the NIAI (Naoochno-Issledovatel'skiy Aero-Institoot - scientific test aero-institute) which became the focus of several good design engineers who were given command of individual OKB (Osboye Konstrooktorskoye Byuro – personal design/construction bureau).

Lisichkin and Rentel designed the LK-1 in an attempt to build a very efficient small transport aircraft with the wing blending into the fuselage, forming the cockpit and cabin, with seats for three passengers and one pilot with extensive glazing. Construction was all of wood/plywood, with a conventional single spar wing with plywood covering. The engine, with Townend ring cowling, was fitted on the centre-line between the cockpits which gave the pilot an asymmetrical view through the leading edge glazing. The fixed tricycle undercarriage was fitted with spats to reduce drag.

Flight trials at Leningrad and state acceptance tests at the NII GVF(Naoochno-Issledovatel'skiy Institoot Grazdahnskovo Vozdooshnovo Flota - scientific test institute for civil air fleet), in Moscow, were very successful and an order for twenty production aircraft with modified tails, spats removed, no Townend ring, and other modifications was placed, for use by Aeroflot inside the USSR and the Arctic.

Variants 
 NIAI-1P – (Poplavkoviy – with floats), at least one aircraft fitted with twin floats.

Operators

 Aeroflot

Specifications (LK-1 - production)

See also

References

 Gunston, Bill. “The Osprey Encyclopaedia of Russian Aircraft 1875–1995”. London, Osprey. 1995. 

1930s Soviet civil utility aircraft
NIAI aircraft
Aircraft first flown in 1933